The Halles de Schaerbeek is a cultural centre located at 22 rue Royale Sainte-Marie in Schaerbeek, Brussels, in the former Sainte-Marie covered market built in 1865 and destroyed by a fire in 1898.

History

Building
The building was constructed in 1865 under the leadership of the architect Gustave Hansotte, to serve as covered market (covered market Sainte Marie) for peasants from countryside to sell their poultry and their vegetables.

Covered market was destroyed with a fire in 1898 and remained the building of 1865 with the site of a missing clock at the central facade.

The village called a firm specialised in metallic structures. The new covered market of more than 3 000 m ² was inaugurated in October 1901. It is the work of the architect Henry Van Massenhove constructed in 1901 with the help of the constructor Bertaux, specialist of metallic structures.

Market hall

Abandon
The new market remained active up to the vicinity of 1920 but the gradual appearance of supermarkets and numerous department stores is going to cause its decline.

During 50 years, the building stays in the abandonment, sometimes serving as parking or as place of stocking or else as ground of adventures for the children of the district.

Renovation and reassignment
Abandoned from 1920 to the early 1970s, the place was bought in 1973 by Cocof who sold it to the French Community in 1983.

The renovation work, started in 1984, ended in 1997 and Les Halles became a cultural center. It is one of the first industrial sites reallocated as a cultural complex. And in any case the first covered market. The Halles de Schaerbeek is one of the rare buildings with a metallic structure still existing in Brussels.

Example of reallocation of an industrial place into a cultural complex, the Halles include three performance halls: the Grande Halle (capacity: up to 2000 standing spectators), the Petite Halle (multipurpose room) and the Cave (foyer, bar, multi-purpose space).

Les Halles is ideal for circus shows, but their modular infrastructure allows all activities. They are very open to the neighborhood which is home to a multicultural and often disadvantaged population.

Under the impetus of Philippe Grombeer - their first director, they have, since 1991, a vocation of European Cultural Center. Since December 2012, management has been provided by Christophe Galent (former secretary general of the national scene Le Volcan au Havre3).

External links

 Site officiel
 Site officiel de la commune de Schaerbeek
 eBru – Votre guide à Bruxelles
 Brussels architecture

References

Market halls
Buildings and structures in Brussels
Schaerbeek
Sports venues in Brussels